The King's Head is a pub at 65 Bexley High Street, Bexley, London. It is a Grade II listed building, dating back to the 16th or early 17th century.

References

External links
 

Grade II listed pubs in London
Grade II listed buildings in the London Borough of Bexley
Pubs in the London Borough of Bexley